Kotlas is a product tanker, registered in Murmansk, Russia. It operates for the Murmansk Shipping Company and transports oil products around northern Russia and northern Europe.

Description
The ship is registered in Murmansk and is operated by the  Murmansk Shipping Company.

References

Oil tankers
Ships of Russia
Ships of Finland
1989 ships
Murmansk Shipping Company